Antigua and Barbuda will compete at the 2022 World Athletics Championships in Eugene, United States, from 15 to 24 July 2022.

Results 
Antigua and Barbuda has entered 2 athletes.

Men 
Track and road

Women 
Track and road

References

World Championships in Athletics
2022
Nations at the 2022 World Athletics Championships